Cadets on Parade is a 1942 American drama film directed by Lew Landers and written by Howard J. Green. The film stars Freddie Bartholomew, Jimmy Lydon, Joseph Crehan, Raymond Hatton, Minna Gombell and Robert Warwick. The film was released on January 22, 1942, by Columbia Pictures.

Plot
Due to not being good at sports and not adapting to the student life, Austin Shannon decides to run away from military school. The school offers a 1000 dollar reward for Austin's return. Austin meets newsboy Joe Novak, who doesn't seem to care about the reward money, and they both become buddies, Austin educates Joe, while Joe teaches him how to box and play other sports.

Cast          
Freddie Bartholomew as Austin Shannon
Jimmy Lydon as Joe Novak
Joseph Crehan as Jeff Shannon
Raymond Hatton as Gus Novak
Minna Gombell as Della
Robert Warwick as Colonel Metcalfe
Kenneth MacDonald as Dr. Nesbitt
Charles Lind as Jerry
Billy Lechner as Paul
William Blees as Edwards
Emory Parnell as Inspector Kennedy 
Stanley Brown as Lt. Wilson
James Millican as Lt. Thomas
Lloyd Whitlock as Paul's father
Jack Gardner as Photographer
Chuck Hamilton as Cop

References

External links
 

1942 films
American drama films
1942 drama films
Columbia Pictures films
Films directed by Lew Landers
American black-and-white films
1940s English-language films
1940s American films